Margaret E. Bailey (December 25, 1915 – August 28, 2014) was a United States Army Nurse Corps colonel. She served in the Corps for 27 years, from July 1944 to July 1971, nine of which she served in France, Germany, and Japan. During her career, Bailey advanced from a second lieutenant to colonel, the highest achievable military rank in the Nurse Corps. She set several landmarks for black nurses in US military, becoming the first black lieutenant colonel in 1964, the first black chief nurse in a mixed, non-segregated unit in 1966, and the first black full colonel in 1967.

During World War II, Bailey treated German prisoners of war. In the later years of her military career, she actively worked with minority organizations and advocated to increase black participation in the Corps. After her retirement from the Army, she served as a consultant to the Surgeon General in the Nixon administration, working to increase the number of minorities in the Nurse Corps. For many years, she made speeches supporting equal participation in United States Army across the United States.

Early life 
Bailey grew up in one of the most segregated areas of the South. She was born in Selma, Alabama on December 25, 1915. Her father, Adam Bailey, died when she was eight years old, and her mother, Hattie Bailey, moved the family to Mobile, Alabama. There, Bailey graduated from W.H. Council Elementary School, then from Emerson Junior High School, and in 1933, from Dunbar High School. As a child, Bailey walked past a local hospital on her way to school, and tidy look of medical personnel prompted her ambition to become a nurse. During the Great Depression, Bailey worked on school nights and Saturdays to help her family. After graduating from Dunbar High School, she worked for two years to save enough money to further her education. In 1935, she was accepted to the Fraternal Hospital School of Nursing in Montgomery, Alabama.

Civilian nursing career (1938 – 1944) 

In 1938, Bailey graduated from the nursing school and found a job at Mercy Hospital in St. Petersburg, Florida, then the only primary care facility for the local Black community.

This was career success, as opportunities for black women in the South were scarce, and generally limited to cleaning, teaching, or nursing, all strictly within segregated facilities for black people. However, a year later, in September 1939, Bailey surprised her colleagues and became the first black nurse to voluntarily resign her position at Mercy Hospital. She had found a better nursing position at Seaview Hospital on Staten Island, New York.

At the time, this hospital was the nation's largest facility, specializing in the treatment of tuberculosis, and the most expensive municipal medical establishment in the United States. Unlike Mercy Hospital in Florida, Seaview Hospital was non-segregated, and already had a history of promoting black nurses to supervising positions.

Bailey worked at Seaview Hospital for almost five years, until she decided to enlist in US military in the summer of 1944.

Military career (1944 – 1971) 
Bailey joined the United States Army Nurse Corps in June 1944, at the start of Normandy landings. She was motivated by the raging world war, and believed that wounded Americans would need her help. At the time, the US military was segregated, and the Army Nurse Corps was reluctant to admit black nurses at all until 1941, when the first blacks were accepted under pressure from the National Association of Colored Graduate Nurses and Eleanor Roosevelt personally. Still, at the end of 1943, only 183 black nurses served in a Corps of 52,000 nurses, and they routinely faced discrimination.

Bailey was assigned to "all-Negro unit" in the Corps. Ironically, the start of Bailey's military career brought her not to the European theater, but to Arizona where she completed basic training at Fort Huachuca and received her entry rank of second lieutenant. Then she was assigned to Station Hospital in Florence, Arizona to care for German prisoners of war.

In subsequent years, Bailey served as both medical and surgical nurse at numerous domestic and international facilities, including in France, Germany, and Japan. Despite intermittent racial discrimination, Bailey gradually advanced through the ranks. In 1950, she completed a six-month psychiatric nursing course at Brooke Army Medical Center, which led to her promotion to captain. Undeterred by frequent transfers, Bailey started taking evening university courses wherever she was, slowly earning a university degree. Over the next nine years, she accumulated enough credits from the University of Michigan, the University of Maryland in Germany, and the San Francisco State College to receive her bachelor's degree in nursing from the San Francisco State College in 1959.

On July 15, 1964, after 20 years of service, Bailey was promoted to lieutenant colonel, becoming the first black nurse to achieve such rank. In May 1965 (as the Army's segregation policy ended), she was transferred to the 130th General Hospital in Chinon, France, her first assignment in a mixed-race unit. In 1966, she became the chief nurse of the unit and the first black nurse to lead a non-segregated unit.

In February 1969, Bailey received the Army Commendation Medal from the hands of General John H. Cushman. Later that year, she was transferred to Washington D.C. as a Health Manpower Training Specialist with the Department of Labor. In January 1970, Bailey became the first black person to attain the rank of colonel, the highest military rank possible within the United States Army Nurse Corps.

Bailey retired in July, 1971, after 27 years of service, nine of which she served outside the United States. She was regarded as an "exemplary professional officer." Upon her retirement, she was awarded the Legion of Merit, the second highest non-combat award. During her service, she reached the highest rank possible within her Corps, witnessed the end of the Army's policy of segregation, and visited 27 countries. In the final years of her military career, Bailey devoted more and more time to recruiting black women to the Nurse Corps.

Political career and social activism 
In the early years of her Army career, especially during her stations abroad, Bailey frequently encountered people who had never worked with or even seen a black woman before. She enjoyed taking extra steps to educate these people about black culture, believing these actions to be important steps towards integration. In her later years, Bailey enthusiastically supported recruiting more black women into the Army. While stationed in Aurora, Colorado, she was in contact with local women's rights organizations and was in charge of the official military Nightingale program (named after Florence Nightingale and publicly advocated for minority recruitment to the Nurse Corps.

Bailey was in the "vanguard of the integration movement." As the policy of segregation in the Army ended in 1965, she called it "difficult yet rewarding milestone". Yet, at that time only 6.6% of the Nurse Corps were black, so Bailey continued her efforts to increase black participation.

After her retirement from the Army, on July 1, 1971, Bailey accepted the position of Consultant to the Surgeon General with the special responsibility to promote increased participation of minorities the in Army Nurse Corps. This assignment was commended by the National Association for the Advancement of Colored People, which witnessed the Nixon administration promote Bailey and 155 other black public servants to government positions.

In the last years of her military service and throughout her retirement, Bailey regularly made speeches in black communities to promote integration and military service. For example, on February 27, 2000, 84-year-old Bailey traveled from her Washington D.C. home to Alabama to speak at the Shiloh Missionary Baptist Church. On occasion, Bailey partnered with Clara Adams-Ender to advocate for more black participation in the Army. Baily was a speaker at the National Black Nurses Association's summit in 1998 and took part in international conferences in South Africa and Botswana.

In 1999, Bailey completed and published her autobiography The Challenge. She was also an active member of Chi Eta Phi, a professional organization of registered nurses and nursing students.

Awards 
Bailey received multiple awards and commendations both for her Army service and her activism. Her Army medals included the World War II Victory Medal, American Campaign Medal, National Defense Medal, Army Commendation Medal, and Legion of Merit, the second highest non-combat military award.

In 1967 and 1969, she was named the Woman of the Year by several women's organizations.

Death
Bailey died on August 28, 2014 in Washington D.C. She was buried on Arlington National Cemetery.

Bibliography

See also 
 Clara Adams-Ender
 United States Army Nurse Corps
 Florence Nightingale

References

Literature cited

External links 
 Overcoming barriers: African-American women in the military
 African-American 'firsts' key to Army history
 Arlington National Cemetery

1915 births
2014 deaths
African-American nurses
American women nurses
American nursing administrators
United States Army Nurse Corps officers
Recipients of the Legion of Merit
African-American female military personnel
People from Mobile, Alabama
People from Selma, Alabama
20th-century African-American people
21st-century African-American people
20th-century African-American women
21st-century African-American women
African-American United States Army personnel